The Kesha and the Creepies: Fuck the World Tour is the third headlining concert tour by American singer Kesha. The tour started in Las Vegas on July 23, 2016.  The tour has been described by her as "So, for a short ride and in mostly intimate venues, I will be performing a new creepy creation. It's been too long", and "Songs you’ve never heard me play before and I may never play again".  The tour traveled throughout North America, and was extended to Asia, playing three shows in China in October.

Background and development
On February 19, 2016, New York Supreme Court Justice Shirley Kornreich ruled against Kesha's request for a preliminary injunction that would release her from her contract with Kemosabe Records, a label owned by Lukasz Gottwald, also known as Dr. Luke, under the umbrella of Sony Music Entertainment.  This later inspired her to create the tour, "for the pure love of rock n roll" and it is seen as an act of defiance.

Set list

"We R Who We R"
"Your Love Is My Drug"
"Dinosaur"
"Nightclubbing" 
"True Colors"
"You Don't Own Me" 
"Blow"
"Speaking in Tongues" 
"Boots & Boys"
"Cannibal"
"Timber"
"Tik Tok"
Encore

Notes 
 On select dates, Kesha performed "Till the World Ends" and "Die Young", in place of "True Colors" and "I Shall Be Released", respectively.
 "Old Flames Can't Hold a Candle to You" was not performed on select dates.
 During the Asian leg, Kesha performed "Stephen", "Jealous", "Warrior", "Gold Trans Am", "Dirty Love", "Party at a Rich Dude's House", and "Animal".

Tour dates

References

Footnotes

Citations

Kesha concert tours
2016 concert tours
2017 concert tours